Mars is a station on Metra's Milwaukee District West Line in Chicago, Illinois. In Metra's zone-based fare system, Mars is in zone B. As of 2018, Mars is the 175th busiest of Metra's 236 non-downtown stations, with an average of 144 weekday boardings.

As of December 12, 2022, Mars is served as a flag stop by 14 trains (eight inbound, six outbound) on weekdays only.

Mars station consists of three tracks and two side platforms. The middle track has no platform, so stopping trains must use the outer tracks. Metra's North Central Service trains use the tracks but do not stop.

The station is named for the Mars, Incorporated candy factory located on Oak Park Avenue in the Galewood neighborhood, right behind the station. The Chicago Park District's Rutherford Sayre Park immediately sits west of the station. A Shriners children's hospital sits to the north of the station.

References

External links 

Station from Oak Park Avenue from Google Maps Street View

Metra stations in Chicago
Former Chicago, Milwaukee, St. Paul and Pacific Railroad stations
Railway stations in the United States opened in 1956